"Baby Forgive Me" is a song by Swedish singer-songwriter Robyn, recorded for her eighth studio album Honey. It was released as the sixth single from the album on 6 November 2019 with a remix by Young Marco. A remix by Floorplan followed on 3 July 2020.

Composition
The deep house track features vocals "haunted" by "a sinister, off-key electronic shadow", with sounds of audience cheering in the distance. The song fades seamlessly into the album's next track "Send to Robin Immediately".

Release
On 20 June 2020, Robyn released "Baby Forgive Me" on a limited edition 12" vinyl featuring remixes of the song released as part of a Honey Remix vinyl series, alongside vinyls of "Honey", Beach 2k20" "Between the Lines" and "Ever Again", for the Love Record Stores Day 2020 event. Only 500 of each were manufactured.

Track listing

Personnel
Credits adapted from the liner notes of Honey.
 Robyn – vocals, vocal arranging, additional arranging, songwriting, vocal recording
 Joseph Mount – production, vocal arranging, vocal recording
 Klas Åhlund - vocal recording
 Mr. Tophat (Rudolf Nordström) - drum programming, sad robot voice, additional arranging, vocal arranging, songwriting, production, vocal recording
 David Jones - studio assistance
 NealHPogue – mixing
 Mike Bozzi – mastering

Charts

References

2019 singles
2018 songs
Robyn songs
Songs written by Robyn